The Battle of Hjörungavágr (Norwegian: Slaget ved Hjørungavåg) is a semi-legendary naval battle that took place in the late 10th century between the Jarls of Lade and a Danish invasion fleet led by the fabled Jomsvikings. This battle played an important role in the struggle by Haakon Sigurdsson  (c. 937 – 995) to unite his rule over Norway. Traditionally, the battle has been set during the year 986, though the Gesta Wulinensis ecclesiae pontificum has the year 984 as the year of the battle.

History 
During this period, Denmark was the dominant power in the Nordic region.  Southern Norway and the Oslo Fjord sometimes lay directly under Danish rule. Haakon Sigurdsson ruled Norway as a vassal of King Harald Bluetooth of Denmark (died c. 985/86), but for the most part seemed to remain an independent ruler. Haakon  was a strong believer in the old Norse gods. When Harald Bluetooth attempted to force Christianity upon him around 975, Haakon broke his allegiance to Denmark.
Harald Bluetooth had suffered defeat from Otto II, Holy Roman Emperor during 974. Haakon took advantage of the weakened position of the Danish king to make Norway independent of Denmark.  With the convincing victory, Haakon Sigurdsson remained Norway's sole ruler and Denmark's claim over Norway was rejected and not repeated again until the Battle of Svolder about fourteen years later.

Location
Jómsvíkinga saga offers two mutually contradictory descriptions of the bay on the coast of Sunnmøre in which the battle took place. According to the first one, Hjorungavágr lies on the landward side of the island Hoð (now Hareidlandet in Møre og Romsdal). According to the other, the bay is situated south of an island called Primsigð/Primsignd and north of an island called Horund. Both of these names are not in common use today.

Sources 
The battle is described in the Norse kings' sagas—including Heimskringla—as well as in Jómsvíkinga saga and Saxo Grammaticus' Gesta Danorum. Saxo Grammaticus estimated that the battle took place while Harald Bluetooth was still alive. Some scholarly traditions have set the battle in 986 whereas the Gesta Wulinensis ecclesiae pontificum has 984 as the year of the battle.
Some contemporary skaldic poetry alludes to the battle, including verses by Þórðr Kolbeinsson and Tindr Hallkelsson. The battle was also the subject of later poems and sagas. Jómsvíkingadrápa by Bjarni Kolbeinsson honors the fallen Jomsvikings at the Battle of Hjörungavágr. Vellekla, composed by the Icelandic skald Einarr Helgason, speaks of the Battle of Hjörungavágr. Fagrskinna, contains a history of Norway with a heavy emphasis on battles, including the Battle of Hjörungavágr.

See also 
 Sigvaldi Strut-Haraldsson
 Vagn Åkesson
 Eiríkr Hákonarson
 Thorkell the Tall
 Vigfúss Víga-Glúmsson
 Þorgerðr Hölgabrúðr and Irpa

References

Related reading 
 Näsström, Britt-Mari (2001)  Blot - tro og offer i det førkristne Norden (Pax)   
 Steinsland, Gro (2005) Norrøn religion. Myter, riter, samfunn (Pax)   
 Fløtre, Odd Karstein (2009) Jomsvikingslaget i oppklarende lys (Hatlehols Grafiske AS)   
 Ottesen, Johan (2010)  Slagstaden (Fotoarkivet)  
 Larsen, Stein Ugelvik   (2006) Striden om stedet : Hjørungavåg-slaget i norsk historie og kulturdebatt (Sunnmørsposten forl.)

External links 
 Historic play at Hjørungavåg
 Vågen ved "stein": Steinvågen by Bjørn Jonson Dale 
 Hjørungavåg National Monument

Hjorungavagr
Hjorungavagr
Hjorungavagr
Jomsvikings
980s conflicts
986
10th century in Norway
Sunnmøre